The volleyball competition at the 2019 Games of the Small States of Europe was held at the Mediterranean Sport Center, Budva from 28 May to 1 June 2019. The beach volleyball competition was held at the Slovenska Plaza, Budva from 28 to 31 May 2019.

Medal summary

Medal table

Medalists

Men

Indoor

|}

|}

Women

Indoor

|}

|}

References

2019 Games of the Small States of Europe
Games of the Small States of Europe
2019
Volleyball in Montenegro